B.S.S. Sporting Club is a professional football club based in Kolkata, West Bengal. Founded in 2015, the club competes in CFL Premier Division A, the top-tier football league in West Bengal organised by Indian Football Association, football governing body of West Bengal.

History 
B.S.S. Sporting Club, which started its journey in the year 2015, has already became a pioneer in the Kolkata football circuits. It has created history by becoming champions for consecutive 3 years in the CFL lower divisions, before stepping into the Premier Division.

In 2019, B.S.S. Sporting participated in Governor's Gold Cup in Sikkim.

B.S.S. Sporting has been participating in the prestigious IFA Shield tournament as well, since 2020.

Stadium 
Sailen Manna Stadium (also known as Howrah Municipal Corporation Stadium) is club's home stadium, together with Baksha Sporting Association Ground.

Personnel

Players

Current squad

Sponsorship history
In mid-2010s, the club acquired service of Trak-Only as their main shirt sponsor.

Statistics and records 
2020-21 CFL Premier Division A: Quarter-Final

2019-20 CFL Premier Division A: 6th place

2018-19 CFL Premier Division B:
4th place

2017-18 CFL 1st Division:
1st place

2016-17 CFL 2nd Division:
1st place

2015-16 CFL 3rd Division:
1st place

Honours

League
CFL 1st Division
Champions (1): 2017
CFL 2nd Division
Champions (1): 2016
CFL 3rd Division
Champions (1): 2015

Cup
Trades Cup
Champions (1): 2017
Republic Cup Lumding
Champions (1): 2023

See also
 Football in Kolkata
 List of football clubs in West Bengal

References

External links

BSS Sporting Club at Soccerway

Football clubs in Kolkata